The Boy Scouts of America has two councils named Cherokee Area Council:

 Cherokee Area Council (Oklahoma)
 Cherokee Area Council (Tennessee)